The German Clock Road or German Clock Route is a holiday route that runs from the Central Black Forest through the Southern Black Forest to the Baar region and thus links the centres of Black Forest clock manufacturing. It is about 320 kilometres long.

Towns, villages and counties 
The towns and villages along the route (in alphabetic order) are Deißlingen, Eisenbach, Furtwangen, Gütenbach, Hornberg, Königsfeld, Lauterbach, Lenzkirch, Niedereschach, Rottweil, Schönwald, Schonach, Schramberg, Simonswald, St. Georgen, St. Märgen, St. Peter, Titisee-Neustadt, Triberg, Trossingen, Villingen-Schwenningen, Vöhrenbach, Waldkirch.

The counties through which the German Clock Road runs are Schwarzwald-Baar, Breisgau-Hochschwarzwald, Rottweil, Tuttlingen, Emmendingen and Ortenau.

Attractions en route

With a clock theme 

 German Clock Museum in Furtwangen im Schwarzwald with the largest collection of clocks in Germany
 Museum of Clockmaking in Villingen-Schwenningen which focusses on the history of clock manufacture
 Largest cuckoo clock in the world in Schonach im Schwarzwald
 Gütenbach Village Museum with many clocks by local clockmakers
 St. Märgen's Abbey Museum, which portrays the development of the Black Forest clock and Black Forest clock dealers abroad
 ErfinderZeiten Museum in the car and clock world in Schramberg with an emphasis on the Schramberg clock factory of Junghans as well as the development of the Black Forest clock industry in general

Other attractions 
 Triberg Waterfalls, which is one of the highest and best known waterfalls in Germany
 Black Forest Railway, a technically unusual mountain railway with 40 tunnels
 Titisee, the largest natural lake in the Black Forest
 Baroque churches and abbeys in St. Märgen and St. Peter
 German Harmonica Museum in Trossingen

Literature 
 Rüdiger Gramsch: Wo die Stunde schlägt. Mit Hansy Vogt unterwegs auf der Deutschen Uhrenstraße. Silberburg Verlag GmbH, Tübingen 2017. . (Stationen an der Deutschen Uhrenstraße). (in German)

See also 

 German Clock Museum
 Black Forest Clock Association
 Black Forest
 List of largest cuckoo clocks

External links 

Website of the German Clock Road

Notes and references 

German tourist routes
Clocks in Germany
Black Forest